Uriman Airport  is an airport serving Uriman, a village in the Bolívar State of Venezuela. The village is on the Caroní River. The runway parallels the river and also serves as Uriman's main street. There is rising terrain south, and distant high terrain to the north of the airport.

See also

Transport in Venezuela
List of airports in Venezuela

References

External links 
OurAirports - Uriman Airport
FallingRain - Uriman Airport
SkyVector - Uriman Airport

Airports in Venezuela
Bolívar (state)